Iryna Henadzeuna Zhuk, née Yakaltsevich (born 26 January 1993), is a Belarusian athlete specialising in the pole vault. She represented her country at the 2016 Summer Olympics without qualifying for the final. She won the gold medal at the 2017 Summer Universiade. In 2021, Zhuk tied for third at the European Athletics Indoor Championships with Holly Bradshaw. Zhuk competed at the 2020 Summer Olympics, this time reaching the final.

Zhuk's personal bests in the event are 4.74 metres outdoors (2021) and 4.80 metres indoors (2022). Both marks are also national records.

She is married to Belarusian athlete Vital Zhuk.

International competitions

References

1993 births
Living people
Sportspeople from Grodno
Belarusian female pole vaulters
Athletes (track and field) at the 2016 Summer Olympics
Athletes (track and field) at the 2020 Summer Olympics
Olympic athletes of Belarus
Universiade medalists in athletics (track and field)
Universiade gold medalists for Belarus
Medalists at the 2017 Summer Universiade
Athletes (track and field) at the 2010 Summer Youth Olympics